Carolyne Anne Christie (born  27 December 1946) is a member of the British aristocracy, known for having been married to Rock Scully, manager of the Grateful Dead, and later to Roger Waters of Pink Floyd, who wrote songs about her. Her son Harry Waters is also a successful musician.

Family 

Christie's parents were Hector Lorenzo Christie and Lady Jean Agatha Dundas. Her mother's father was Lawrence John Lumley Dundas, 2nd Marquess of Zetland and so she is niece to Lawrence Aldred Mervyn Dundas, 3rd Marquess of Zetland, and a cousin to both Mark Dundas, 4th Marquess of Zetland and Lord David Dundas. She has a brother, Willie Christie. Through Harry, she has grandchildren.

Early marriages 

Christie married John Julian Reynolds in 1966; however they divorced in 1970. She married Rock Scully in 1974, but they separated and divorced the following year. Scully's brother has subsequently expressed doubts about the legality of the union, which Scully misrepresented to his common-law wife as a green card marriage. Sources gave different dates for these divorces.

Roger Waters 

After her divorce from Scully, Christie married Roger Waters, the bass player of the English rock band Pink Floyd; this was his second marriage. Their wedding cake was a gift from her friend, Sarah Ferguson, later Duchess of York. They had two children, Harry (born 16 November 1976), a keyboard player in his father's band as well as other bands, and India Rose (born 25 April 1978), a model, before divorcing in 1992.

The two-part song "Pigs on the Wing" on Pink Floyd's Animals album is a love song from Waters for Christie, and a hidden message in the song "Empty Spaces", on the follow-up album The Wall, refers to her. It was Christie's suggestion that Bob Ezrin be asked to produce the latter album.

Waters employed Christie's brother Willie to take photographs for the cover of his last album with Pink Floyd, The Final Cut, and to direct the accompanying short film.

References 

Living people
1946 births
Roger Waters